François Eisenbarth (27 March 1928 – 17 September 1987) was a Luxembourgian gymnast. He competed in six events at the 1960 Summer Olympics.

References

1928 births
1987 deaths
Luxembourgian male artistic gymnasts
Olympic gymnasts of Luxembourg
Gymnasts at the 1960 Summer Olympics
People from Rumelange
20th-century Luxembourgian people